Coltart is a surname. Notable people with the surname include:

Andrew Coltart (born 1970), Scottish golfer and TV commentator
David Coltart (born 1957), Zimbabwean lawyer, Christian leader, and politician
John G. Coltart (1826–1868), Confederate officer
Nina Coltart (1927–1997), British psychoanalyst, psychotherapist, and essayist